The Cristallina is a mountain of the Lepontine Alps, located in the Swiss canton of Ticino. It is situated between the valleys of Leventina, Val Bavona and Valle di Peccia (the latter two belonging to the Valle Maggia. On the west side of the mountain is located the Passo Cristallina with the Cristallina Hut.

References

External links
 Cristallina on Summitpost

Mountains of the Alps
Mountains of Switzerland
Mountains of Ticino
Lepontine Alps